Moubray may refer to:

Moubray Glacier, Antarctica
Moubray Piedmont Glacier, Antarctica
Moubray Bay, Antarctica
Moubray St John, 19th Baron St John of Bletso (1877-1934), an English peer
John James Moubray, Lord Lieutenant of Kinross-shire, Scotland, from 1911 to 1928

See also
Moubray House, Edinburgh, Scotland
Mowbray (disambiguation)